Giuseppe De Feudis (born 10 July 1983) is an Italian former footballer.

Biography
Born in Bollate, the province of Milan, Lombardy, De Feudis started his professional career at Lombardy side Como. After the team promoted to Serie B in 2001, he was loaned to Serie C2 side San Marino Calcio. San Marino bought him in co-ownership deal after the season, and bought him outright in June 2003.

Cesena
De Feudis was then sold to Serie C1 side Cesena, starting his long-term relationship with the Emilia–Romagna side. De Feudis made some substitute appearances for the club and won promotion to Serie B with the club in 2004. He made a few appearances in Serie B and was loaned out to Serie C1 side Lucchese in January 2005, as part of the Simone Masini deal. In the 2005–06 season, he remained in the 3rd tier of Italian football, playing for former club San Marino.

On 1 July 2006, De Feudis returned to Cesena, when the team just missed promotion by losing in the playoff semi–final first round. He became a first team player by starting 22 league matches when Cesena finished mid–table in the 2006–07 season. He then signed a new deal with the club mid–season which lasted until 2009. In the 2007–08 season, De Feudis started 37 league matches and stook with the team when Cesena was relegated back to the 1st Division, formerly known as Serie C, in 2008. In 2009, De Feudis won the 1st Division Group A title with Cesena as the club was promoted back to Serie B. He started 39 Serie B games and finished runner–up with team in 2010, winning his first ever Serie A promotion.

On 6 July 2010, he signed a new 1-year deal with Cesena for the 2010–11 Serie A season.

Torino
On 31 August he was loaned to Serie B club Torino in exchange for Nicolas Gorobsov after the club signed high caliber midfielders such as Stephen Appiah and Fabio Caserta.

He signed a permanent deal with Torino in August 2011, before he left the club for Padova in January 2013 where he wore the number 27 shirt.

Return to Cesena
On 11 July 2013, De Feudis returned his former team Cesena on a two-year contract. In the 2013–2014 season he played a key role in the team's promotion to the top flight. On 31 August 2014 he made his Serie A debut against Parma.

Lecce
On 17 July 2015 he moved to Lecce. He played 15 matches for the giallorossi and scored a goal.

Arezzo
On 11 August 2016 he was signed by Arezzo.

Honours
Champion
Lega Pro Prima Divisione: 2009
Runner–up
Serie B: 2010

References

External links
 Profile at Cesena  
 Profile at Football.it 
 Profile at La Gazzetta dello Sport (2009–10) 
 Profile at La Gazzetta dello Sport (2007–08) 
 Profile at La Gazzetta dello Sport (2006–07) 
 

1983 births
Living people
People from Bollate
Italian footballers
Serie A players
Serie B players
Como 1907 players
A.S.D. Victor San Marino players
A.C. Cesena players
S.S. Arezzo players
U.S. Lecce players
S.S.D. Lucchese 1905 players
Torino F.C. players
Calcio Padova players
Association football midfielders
Footballers from Lombardy
Sportspeople from the Metropolitan City of Milan